Peter James Brand (born 5 April 1967) is a Canadian Egyptologist from Toronto, Ontario. He is also a naturalized American citizen. He completed his PhD in 1998 at the University of Toronto with his dissertation The Monuments of Seti I: Epigraphic, Historical and Art Historical Analysis.  This was later published by Brill in 2000 and is considered to be one of the most comprehensive studies on the reign of Seti I who is often eclipsed in history by the glorious 66-year reign of his son, Ramesses II. A Book reviewer called it "the first comprehensive study of the reign (of Seti I) ever published." (see p.114)"It contains a catalogue of most of Seti I's monuments and an important discussion of the historical significance and reigns of Ramesses I and Seti I. Brand also attended the University of Texas at Arlington and the University of Memphis prior to the University of Toronto.  

Brand has previously taught at the University of Toronto and is currently an associate professor at the University of Memphis in the Department of History. His primary scholarly interest is in the art history of the Ramesside Period of Ancient Egypt. He has been the Field co-Director of the Karnak Great Hypostyle Hall Project of the University of Memphis since 2001, along with Dr. Jean Revez, professor at the Université du Québec à Montréal.  In 2009, Peter J. Brand published a paper in the University of Memphis serial titled "Causing His Name to Live: Studies in Egyptian Epigraphy and History in Memory of William J. Murnane". It was called: "Usurped Cartouches of Merenptah at Karnak and Luxor"

References

External links
Brand's University of Memphis homepage

American archaeologists
American Egyptologists
Canadian Egyptologists
Canadian emigrants to the United States
University of Toronto alumni
Academic staff of the University of Toronto
Living people
1967 births
University of Texas at Arlington alumni
University of Memphis alumni